The YLC-2 radar (domestic designation: LLQ303, formerly known as 385) is a three-dimensional main guidance and surveillance radar developed by the Nanjing Research Institute of Electronics Technology.

In the mid-2000s, an improved version labeled YLC-2A was deployed to the PLA. Equipped with a new Giga-flops digital signal processor, it is capable of Digital Moving Target Indication (DMTI) and Constant false alarm rate (CFAR) processing. An S-band variation called YLC-2U with similar capabilities was also developed for SAM guidance. Both of these advanced YLC-2 radars have been specifically designed to counter stealth fighters such as F-22, with a claimed range of up to 200km even in heavy ECM environment.

Specifications 
 L - band
 Power Output: 5.5 KW
 Peak Power: 85 KW
 Detection range: >500km
 Accuracy: range 200m
 Azimuth: 3600
 Height: <500 m(R: <200km); 750 m(R: 300km)
 Resolution range: <100m
 Elevation 0.50 - +200
 MTI improvement factor: 44dB
 Antenna aperture: 7m x 9m
 Antenna sidelobe level: -35dB
 Other features:
 Phased array system and pencil beam scan technology
 Wide band low sidelobe planar array antenna
 Monopulse angle measurement
 Frequency diversity
 Distributed high power solid-state transmitter
 Advanced programmable digital signal processing

Operators
 :Primary User
 :YLC-18 radar
 : YLC-18

 :China sold unknown number of YLC-2V radars to Myanmar in 2014.
Bangladesh: On service of Bangladesh Air Force Air force since 2013.Order was placed in 2011.

References

External links 
 NRIET
 PLA Air Defence Radars Technical Report APA-TR-2009-0103
Ground radars
Military radars of the People's Republic of China